Talakaveri Wildlife Sanctuary is a wildlife sanctuary in Karnataka state of South India. It is located in Kodagu district and is spread over 105 km². It borders with  Ranipuram hills and Kottencheri hills in Kasaragod district of Kerala.

Flora and fauna
Albizia lebbeck, Artocarpus lakoocha, Dysoxylum malabaricum and Mesua ferrea' are some of the species of flora found here. Clawless otter, Asiatic Elephant, Bengal tiger, Stripe-necked mongoose and mouse deer are some of the animal species found here. Fairy bluebird, Malabar trogon and Broadbilled roller are some of the avian species found.

References

External links

South Western Ghats montane rain forests
Wildlife sanctuaries of the Western Ghats
Wildlife sanctuaries in Karnataka
Kodagu district
1987 establishments in Karnataka
Protected areas established in 1987